It's Always 1999 is the first album by the noise rock band Mindflayer. It was released as a CD-R in 2001 before being released by Load Records in 2004. Front cover artwork and title by Miles Larson.

Track listing
"Worm is Coming" – 2:22
"Repeating Tiger Fist and G Flury" – 2:35
"Destructed but Bits Rush (Let's Grow)" – 6:10
"Argamnimals" – 3:21
"5 Minutes of Sporadic Beats" – 4:15
"Legiomnomein and G Furry" (Legos) – 1:27
"Wind War Wind Blast Army" – 2:14
"Afterwarwards" – 0:51
"Revenge of Whales/Whale War" – 6:40
"Legiomnomein and Jumbinube Oboplex Company Marches" – 2:53
"Cyclone Ride to Animal Town" – 3:38
"Psychic Fields of Animal Town" – 6:10
"Mud Lazer Lazy Lazers" – 2:04
"Azaglians Troupe Hat Ribbons Fite Dance" – 2:01
"2nd Ribbons Wear On" – 3:42
"Zorthians Grazel Time" – 4:58
"Zorthians Finished" – 1:14
"1999 Animals Revenge" – 5:22
"Humbinobodos" – 2:30
"Carry on my Wayward Crawler" – 3:57
"Wolfs and Whales" – 4:32

References

2001 albums
2004 albums
Mindflayer (band) albums